Zoilamérica Ortega Murillo (née Narváez Murillo) (born November 13, 1967, in Managua) is a consultant for Comunidad Casabierta, an LGBTI rights organisation in Costa Rica. She is also a former member of the National Assembly of Nicaragua.

In 1998, she accused her stepfather, Daniel Ortega, of sexually abusing her as a child.

According to her account, April 1989 was the last time that Ortega raped her, through a third party.  In September 1990, her mother threw her out of the presidential house during a nervous breakdown. Zoilamérica was recovering from a leg operation. Beginning in the 1990s, Zoilamérica recounted that her sexual harassment of her by the former president became telephone calls, and was never physical again.

From her exile in Costa Rica she condemned her stepfather during the 2021 Nicaraguan general election.

Personal life 
Her mother is Rosario Murillo, her father was Jorge Narváez Parajón (m. 1967; d. 1997). She is also a stepdaughter of Daniel Ortega, president of Nicaragua.

In popular culture 
The 2019 documentary film Exiliada revolves around and interviews her, as well as her complaints of sexual abuse against Ortega in 1998.

References

1967 births
Child sexual abuse in Nicaragua
Costa Rican LGBT rights activists
Living people
Members of the National Assembly (Nicaragua)
Nicaraguan women activists
21st-century Nicaraguan women politicians
21st-century Nicaraguan politicians
People from Managua